American actor Bob Steele (Robert North Bradbury Jr. January 23, 1907December 21, 1988),  and his twin brother Bill were the sons of film director Robert N. Bradbury. The twins began their acting career in the silent film The Adventures of Bill and Bob, directed by their father, and continued in a series of Bradbury Sr.'s film shorts.  Bill later pursued a career in medicine. Bob continued to act under his real name, until The Mojave Kid  when he was billed as Bob Steele. During his career of more than 100 films and television shows between 1920 and 1974, he was known primarily for his work in Westerns.  Steele appeared as the recurring character of Tucson Smith in 20 of the Three Mesquiteers serials produced by Republic Pictures. He became familiar to America's television audiences for his recurring role as Trooper Duffy in the comedy series F Troop.

Filmography

Television

Bibliography 

 Fagen, Herb (2003). The Encyclopedia of Westerns. New York: Facts On File. .

Notes

External links
 
Bob Steele - UCLA holdings

Male actor filmographies
American filmographies